Charles Martin Rademacher was an American football player and college sports coach. He served as the head football coach (1915), basketball coach (1915–1916) and baseball coach (1916) at the University of Idaho. Rademacher later served as the head football coach and athletic director at Saint Louis University.

Rademacher played college football at the University of Chicago under head coach Amos Alonzo Stagg, serving as team captain in 1911.

In 1912, Rademacher was appointed athletic director and coach at the New Mexico Military Institute in Roswell, New Mexico. He returned to the same post at New Mexico Military in 1925.

Head coaching record

Football

References

Year of birth missing
Year of death missing
American football guards
American football tackles
Chicago Maroons football players
Idaho Vandals football coaches
Idaho Vandals men's basketball coaches
Idaho Vandals baseball coaches
New Mexico Military Broncos football coaches
Saint Louis Billikens football coaches
Saint Louis Billikens athletic directors